The 2018–19 Cornell Big Red men's basketball team represented Cornell University during the 2018–19 NCAA Division I men's basketball season. The Big Red, led by third-year head coach Brian Earl, played their home games at Newman Arena in Ithaca, New York as members of the Ivy League.

Previous season 
The Big Red finished the season 12–16, 6–8 in Ivy League play to finish in fourth place. They lost in the semifinals of the Ivy League tournament to Harvard.

Offseason

Departures

Roster

Schedule and results

|-
!colspan=9 style=| Exhibition

|-
!colspan=9 style=| Non-conference regular season

|-
!colspan=9 style=| Ivy League regular season

|-
!colspan=12 style=|CollegeInsider.com Postseason tournament
|-

Source

References

Cornell Big Red men's basketball seasons
Cornell
Cornell Big Red men's basketball
Cornell Big Red men's basketball
Cornell